Lubricogobius is a genus of fish in the family Gobiidae found in the Pacific Ocean.

Species
There are currently 6 recognized species in this genus:
 Lubricogobius dinah J. E. Randall & Senou, 2001 (Dinah's goby) 
 Lubricogobius exiguus S. Tanaka (I), 1915
 Lubricogobius nanus G. R. Allen, 2015 (Tiny goby) 
 Lubricogobius ornatus Fourmanoir, 1966 (Ornate slippery goby) 
 Lubricogobius tre Prokofiev, 2009
 Lubricogobius tunicatus G. R. Allen & Erdmann, 2016 (Tunicate goby)

References

Gobiidae
Marine fish genera
Taxa named by Shigeho Tanaka